Heirs Holdings is a family-owned investment holding company headquartered in Lagos, Nigeria with investment interests in various sectors in Africa.

History
Heirs Holdings was founded in 2010 by Tony O. Elumelu has more than 670 employees, CON after his retirement in 2010 from the United Bank for Africa (UBA) Plc, where he had served as Group Managing Director.

In 2011, Heirs Holdings made its first investment by acquiring a controlling stake in Transcorp, Nigeria's largest listed conglomerate. 

In 2012, Heirs Holdings made further investments in the real estate and financial sectors. Afriland Properties Plc, a property management, investment, and development company; United Capital Plc, a financial and investment services group; and Africa Prudential Registrar Plc, a share registration service provider.
 
In 2013, Heirs Holdings committed US$2.5bn, as the single largest private sector investor in President Barack Obama Power Africa Initiative with the ambition to add 30,000MW of new electricity generation capacity, to increase electricity access by at least 60 million new connections in Sub-Saharan Africa.

In 2020, Heirs Holdings successfully acquired OML17 from Shell, Total and Eni in what's termed the largest oil and gas transaction in Africa for the year 2020.

Investments overview 
Heirs Holdings' Investments are organised into six verticals:
Financial Services, Power, Oil and Gas, Real Estate, Hospitality and Healthcare.

Financial Services 
Heirs Holdings’ interests and investment in financial services cuts across banking, insurance, investment banking, asset management and capital market registration.    

  United Bank for Africa Plc (UBA) – A Nigerian pan-African financial services group headquartered in Lagos with subsidiaries in 20 African countries and offices in London, Paris, and New York.
 United Capital Plc – Financial and investment services group
 Africa Prudential Registrars – A Nigerian Capital Market Registration Company
 NASD OTC Market – A secondary trading market for securities of unlisted public limited companies (PLC) primarily in Nigeria
 Heirs Insurance Brokers Limited (HIB) – insurance broking and risk management firm. 
 Heirs Insurance Limited – covers general insurance services 
 Heirs Life Assurance Limited – provides specialist life insurance services.

Real Estate and Hospitality 
Investment in property development and facility management services.
 Afriland Properties Plc – Property management development company working across the real estate value chain.
 Transcorp Hotels plc – Nigerian based hospitality firm and owner of the Transcorp Hilton Hotel, Abuja.

Power, Oil & Gas 
Investment in Power, Oil & Gas sectors 
 Transnational Corporation of Nigeria – diversified conglomerate with business interests are in Power and Energy. 
Transcorp Power – power generating companies in Nigeria in electricity generated and wheeled unto the national grid. Following power sector reforms in Nigeria and privatization of national power assets, Transcorp Plc won the bid for a distressed power generating company, Ughelli Power Plc – operator of Ughelli Power Plant in 2012 and the Afam Power Plant in 2020.          
These investments are part of Heirs Holdings’ commitment to USAID’s Power Africa initiative.          
Tenoil Petroleum & Energy Services (TENOIL) – An indigenous operator of OPL 2008, a 40 sq. km block which holds gas reserves and operates under a Production Sharing Contract with the Nigerian National Petroleum Corporation. 
Heirs Oil & Gas – An integrated energy company. In January 2021, Heirs Holdings announced its acquisition of 45% operating stake in a permit known as Oil Mining Lease 17 from Shell, Total and ENI in a deal worth more than $1 billion.

Healthcare 
Investment in health facilities, equipment, and services.   

Avon HMO – A Health maintenance organisation (HMO) licensed by Nigeria’s National Health Insurance Scheme (NHIS) to operate as a national HMO in October 2012
Avon Medical Practice – A private healthcare provider based in Lagos, Nigeria.

Leadership

Board of directors
As of August 1, 2021:
 Tony Elumelu (Chairman)
 Emmanuel Nnorom (CEO) 
 Dr. Awele Elumelu (Non-Executive Director)
 Angela Aneke (Independent Non-Executive Director)
 Alex Trotter (Independent Non-Executive Director)
 Andrew Alli (Independent Non-Executive Director)
 Victor Osadolor (Non-Executive Director)
 Dan Okeke (Executive Director)
 Chiugo Ndubisi (Executive Director)

References

External links
 

2010 establishments in Nigeria
Financial services companies established in 2010
Companies based in Lagos
Multinational companies based in Lagos
Financial services companies of Nigeria
Investment companies of Nigeria
Nigerian companies established in 2010
Holding companies of Nigeria